Paysonia auriculata, the earleaf bladderpod, is a plant species native to the south-central part of the United States. It is widespread in Oklahoma, with isolated populations in Sumner County (Kansas) and from four counties in Texas (Upshur, Austin, Kaufman and Navarro). It occurs in grasslands, prairies, disturbed areas, etc.

Description
Paysonia auriculata is an annual herb up to 20 cm tall. Flowers are yellow, up to 12 mm across. Fruits are spherical, about 7 mm in diameter.

References

auriculata
Flora of Kansas
Flora of Oklahoma
Flora of Texas
Endemic flora of the United States
Flora without expected TNC conservation status